Tryphé (Greek: τρυφἠ) – variously glossed as "softness",
"voluptuousness",
"magnificence"
and "extravagance", none fully adequate – is a concept that drew attention (and severe criticism) in Roman antiquity when it became a significant factor in the reign of the Ptolemaic dynasty.
Classical authors such as Aeschines and Plutarch condemned the tryphé of Romans such as Crassus and Lucullus, which included lavish dinner parties and ostentatious buildings.
But there was more to Ptolemaic tryphé than dissipative excess, which after all can be pursued in residential or geographical seclusion, and for purely private purposes. It was a component of a calculated political strategy, in that it deployed not just conspicuous consumption but also conspicuous magnificence, beneficence and feminine delicacy, as a self-reinforcing cluster of signal propaganda concepts in the Ptolemaic dynasty.

References

External links 

Political science
Ptolemaic Kingdom
Society of ancient Rome